Noble Yeats (foaled 16 May 2015) is an Irish-bred Thoroughbred racehorse who competes in National Hunt racing. In 2022 he won the Grand National under Sam Waley-Cohen, becoming the first seven year old horse to win the race since Bogskar in 1940.

Background

Noble Yeats is a bay gelding bred by Kristene Hunter in Ireland. His sire is Coolmore stallion Yeats, winner of the Ascot Gold Cup in four consecutive years (2006 to 2009) and his dam is That's Moyne, a winner over hurdles. He was sold as a three-year-old in August 2018 to trainer Donal Hassett for €6,500. He made his racecourse debut on 1 December 2019, coming second in a point-to-point, and later that month was sold for £75,000.

2020/21 season

New owner Paul Byrne put Noble Yeats into training with Emmet Mullins. In December 2020 he came third in his first bumper (National Hunt flat race). The following month he secured his first victory, winning a bumper at Thurles. After another bumper, where he came sixth, he was raced over hurdles for the first time. Ridden by Brian Hayes, he started at odds-on favourite in a maiden at Navan and won by twelve lengths.

2021/22 season

After a summer break of seven months, Noble Yeats ran in his first chase and won by a head. After this victory in a beginners' chase at Galway, his owner and trainer decided to enter him for the Grand National. Noble Yeats then ran in two Grade 3 races and two handicaps in Ireland, without being placed in the first three. On 5 February 2022 he had his first race in England, the Grade 2 Towton Novices' Chase at Wetherby Racecourse. He came second of four runners, beaten 5½ lengths by favourite Ahoy Senor. Later that month he was bought by Robert Waley-Cohen as a Grand National ride for his son, amateur jockey Sam Waley-Cohen. Noble Yeats remained in training with Mullins and his next outing was at the Cheltenham Festival where, ridden by Waley-Cohen, he came ninth of 24 runners in the Grade 3 Festival Trophy Handicap Chase.

On 9 April 2022 Noble Yeats, still technically a novice chaser, went off in the Grand National at odds of 50/1. Waley-Cohen had previously announced that it would be his final ride. For the first circuit, Waley-Cohen kept Noble Yeats at the back of the field, moving up to mid-field for the second circuit. Approaching the last, Noble Yeats was level with favourite Any Second Now. He took the lead on the run-in and finished ahead by 2¼ lengths. After the race Waley-Cohen was given a nine-day suspension and £400 fine for his use of the whip in the finish. Noble Yeats was the first seven-year-old to win the Grand National since Bogskar in 1940 and Waley-Cohen was the first amateur jockey to win the race since Marcus Armytage won on Mr Frisk in 1990. He was led into the winner's enclosure at Aintree by groom Mick Molloy. The day after the race he returned home to Leighlinbridge and a celebratory parade with his owner, jockey and trainer.

Grand National record

Pedigree

References

Grand National winners
2015 racehorse births
Racehorses bred in Ireland
Racehorses trained in Ireland
Thoroughbred family 12-d